Yannick Kevin Marchand (born 9 February 2000) is a Swiss professional footballer who plays as a defender for Grasshopper Club Zürich's U21 squad.

Club career
Marchand signed his first professional contract with Basel on 19 April 2018 for 3 years. Marchand made his professional debut for Basel in a 3–2 Swiss Super League win over Luzern on 15 May 2019.

On 16 July 2021, he joined French club Grenoble on loan for the 2021–22 season. His loan was eventually cut short, and he joined Neuchâtel Xamax on loan.

On 16 February 2023, he terminated his contract with Basel early and joined Grasshopper Club Zürich, where he will strengthen their U21 squad, who plays in the 1. Liga Classic.

References

External links
 
 SFL Profile
 SFV U17 Profile
 SFV U18 Profile
 SFV U19 Profile

2000 births
Footballers from Basel
Living people
Swiss men's footballers
Switzerland youth international footballers
Switzerland under-21 international footballers
Association football midfielders
FC Basel players
Grenoble Foot 38 players
Neuchâtel Xamax FCS players
Swiss Super League players
Ligue 2 players
Swiss Challenge League players
Swiss expatriate footballers
Expatriate footballers in France
Swiss expatriate sportspeople in France